Omdurman is a major city in Sudan. It is the most populous city in the country, and thus also in the State of Khartoum. Omdurman lies on the west bank of the River Nile, opposite and northwest of the capital city of Khartoum. It is on the Nile river and acts as an important road hub, with the Nile boosting transportation even further.

Etymology 
The name Omdurman (Umm Durmān) literally translates as "Mother of Durmān", but who she was or might have been is not known.

History

After the siege of Khartoum, followed by the building there of the tomb of the Mahdi after his death from typhus, the city grew rapidly. However, in the Battle of Omdurman in 1898 (which actually took place in the nearby village of Kerreri), Lord Kitchener decisively defeated the Mahdist forces. The following year British forces defeated Abdallahi ibn Muhammad, the Khalifa, as the Battle of Umm Diwaykarat; ensuring British control over the Sudan.

In September 1898, the British army of twenty thousand well drilled men equipped with the latest arms, Maxim guns and Martini-Henry rifles under the command of General Horatio Herbert Kitchener invaded Sudan. In the battle of Omdurman, the British Army faced Sudanese defenders consisting of over 52,000 poorly armed desert tribesmen dervishes; in the space of five hours the battle was over. The Sudanese defenders suffered many casualties, with at least 10,000 killed. By contrast there were fewer than four hundred casualties on the British side with forty-eight British soldiers losing their lives. Then, General Kitchener proceeded to order the desecration of the Mahdi's tomb and in the words of Winston Churchill, "carried off the Mahdi's head in a kerosene can as a trophy".

Kitchener restored Khartoum as the capital and, from 1899 until 1956 Sudan was jointly governed by Great Britain and Egypt. Although most of the city was destroyed in the battle, the Mahdi's tomb was restored and refurbished.

On 10 May 2008, the Darfur rebel group of the Justice and Equality Movement moved into the city where they engaged in heavy fighting with Sudanese government forces. Their goal was to topple Omar Hassan al-Bashir's government.

Climate
Omdurman features a hot arid climate, with only the summer months seeing noticeable precipitation. Based on annual mean temperatures, the city is one of the hottest major cities in the world. Temperatures routinely exceeds  in mid-summer.

Furthermore, throughout the year, none of its monthly average high temperatures falls below . During the months of January and February, while daytime temperatures are generally very warm, nights are relatively cool, with average low temperatures just above .

Demographics

Education
Public universities are:
Karary University
Omdurman Islamic University
University of the Holy Quran and Islamic Sciences

Private universities are:
Ahfad University for Women
Omdurman Ahlia University
University of Science and Technology - Omdurman

Airport

Khartoum Airport serves Omdurman.

Arguably speaking to be within the non-defined boundaries of Omdurman, the project was estimated to be completed by 2012 with an estimated budget of $530 million.

See also
Al-Nilin Mosque
Bant (Omdurman)
 Khalifa House Museum

References

External links
 
 

 
Populated places in Khartoum (state)
Populated places on the Nile